System 7 is the first studio album by the dance/ambient band System 7.

A somewhat different version was released in the United States as 777 by 777. The running order is different, there are different mixes of two tracks (taken from the "Miracle" single), and it has two tracks from the "Freedom Fighters" single – "Depth Disco" and "Mia". Just to confuse matters, 777 was also the title of System 7's second UK album, with completely different music.

With several vocal tracks, this album has rather a different feel from later System 7 albums. Aniff Cousins appears on "Freedom Fighters" (with Zoë providing chorus vocals) and "Dog", and Olu Rowe on "Habibi", "Bon Humeur" and "Strange Quotations".

Style 
Candy Absorption of The Rough Guide to Rock wrote that the album was "accessible, if in retrospect untypical", adding that group leaders Steve Hillage and Miquette Giraudy "were yet to settle into their after-hours, dreamy, chill-out style, and the record features vocals by Olu Rowe reminiscent of Seal." John Bush of AllMusic writes that the album is a "potent crossover record" that explores "the polished end of ambient house". He wrote that Hillage's guitar solos and the structures of several tracks evoke Hillage's mid-1970s work, considering the album to be "space-rock explorations". Davydd Chong of Music Week describes it as an album of "atmospheric sound collages" which are laced with harder-edged material.

The single "Habibi" was described by Chong as "world music dragged through a sweaty sound system at three in the morning". Hillage explained: "'Habibi' means 'my love' in Arabic. I've had a long-term interest in Arabic music, right back to the mid-seventies. It's quite elevating." "Mia (The Fisherman Mix)", found on the American version of the album, is a washing ambient track which features on the 1993 Excursions in Ambience compilation.

Track listing

System 7

777

References

External links 
 System 7  on the official System 7 website

1991 albums
System 7 (band) albums
Ambient house albums
Dance music albums by English artists
Sound collage albums
Space rock albums
Ambient pop albums